The South Congregational Church is a former Congregational and United Church of Christ church building complex located on the intersection of Court and President Streets in Carroll Gardens, Brooklyn, New York City. The complex consisting of a church, original chapel, ladies parlor, and rectory was designated a city landmark by the New York City Landmarks Preservation Commission on March 23, 1982. It was added to the National Register of Historic Places on November 4, 1982.

The chapel was built 1851 and the church in 1857. The ladies parlor was built in 1889 to designs by English-American architect Frederick Charles Merry (d.1900) and the rectory building in 1893 to designs by architect Woodruff Leeming. The church is noteworthy as one of Brooklyn's finest examples of the Early Romanesque Revival architectural style. The designers of the chapel and church remain unknown. In 1874, the Rev. Dr. Albert Josiah Lyman became pastor, and served for 41 years.

The location is believed to have been selected by the famous preacher and abolitionist Henry Ward Beecher, father to author Harriet Beecher Stowe. In the 1980s, as an example of adaptive reuse, the interior of the church complex was converted to apartments and offices.

References

External links

New York City Designated Landmarks in Brooklyn
Churches completed in 1851

Religious buildings and structures completed in 1857
19th-century United Church of Christ church buildings
Religious buildings and structures completed in 1889
Churches completed in 1893

Romanesque Revival church buildings in New York City
Closed churches in New York (state)
Churches in Brooklyn
United Church of Christ churches in New York City
Properties of religious function on the National Register of Historic Places in Brooklyn
1851 establishments in New York (state)
Congregational churches in New York City